This is a list of judges of the Supreme Court of Nepal, the highest court in Nepal. The list is ordered according to seniority. There are currently 16 judges (including the Acting Chief Justice) and maximum possible strength is 21. As per the Constitution of Nepal, judges of the Supreme Court retire at age of 65.

Justice Hari Krishna Karki is the Acting Chief Justice.

List of Judges ordered by seniority

See also

 List of Chief Justices of Nepal

References

External links
Official website

 
Supreme Court of Nepal
Supreme Court of Nepal Judges